Odeda (or Awdeda) is a Local Government Area and town in Ogun State, Nigeria. The headquarters of the LGA are at Odeda on the A5 highway.

It has an area of 1,560 km and a population of 109,449 at the 2006 census. The local government is bounded at Bakatare. A small village close to Oyo State and also bounded at Alogi, a big urban centre that bound the local government area from Abeokuta-south.

The postal code of the area is 110.

References

Local Government Areas in Ogun State